Martin 'Jock' Wallace MG was born in 1969 of Scottish ancestry, grew up in Tamworth, New South Wales, and enlisted in the Australian Army in 1987 at the age of seventeen. He was a member of 152 Signals Squadron and served as a signalman with the Special Air Service Regiment (SASR) when he was awarded the Medal for Gallantry (MG) for his actions on 2 March 2002 during Operation Anaconda while attached to the United States 10th Mountain Division in the Shahi Kot Valley, Afghanistan. He was aged 32 at the time.

The book 18 Hours: The True Story of an SAS War Hero by Sandra Lee, published in 2006, describes the circumstances and his actions that led to the award of the Medal for Gallantry. The medal was presented by the Governor General, Peter Hollingworth, on 27 November 2002. Three other SAS soldiers, (a corporal, a sergeant and a captain), also received awards anonymously for their involvement in the same action. The regiment's commanding officer, (then Lieutenant Colonel Gus Gilmore), was awarded the Distinguished Service Cross (DSC).

Honours and awards

Notes

References

1969 births
Australian military personnel of the War in Afghanistan (2001–2021)
Australian military personnel of the Iraq War
Australian soldiers
Living people
Recipients of the Medal for Gallantry